Fazle Kabir (born 4 July 1955) is a Bangladeshi bureaucrat, economist and central banker. He served as the 11th Governor of Bangladesh Bank, the central bank of Bangladesh. Prior to this position, he served as the Finance Secretary to the government and chairman of the state-owned Sonali Bank. He also served as a director of another state-owned Janata Bank.

Early life
Kabir was born on 4 July 1955 in Dhaka of the then East Bengal (now Bangladesh).His original ancestral home is in a village of Hasail-Banari in Tongibari of Munshiganj (Bikrampur) district. He completed his secondary and higher secondary education at Faujdarhat Cadet College. He obtained his bachelor's and master's degrees in Economics from University of Chittagong.

Career
Kabir started his career in 1980 with Bangladesh Railway as an assistant traffic superintendent. In 1983, he joined the BCS Administration cadre aka Bangladesh Administrative Service. During his 34 years of civil service, Kabir held various key positions in different ministries and also in the field administration. He served as the Deputy Commissioner and District Magistrate of Kishoreganj District, Joint Secretary in the Ministry of Education, Director General of the National Academy for Planning and Development (NAPD), Director General of the Bangladesh Civil Service Administration Academy, Secretary of Ministry of Railways. He was appointed as a senior secretary to the ministry of finance in 2012. Kabir was made the chairman of Sonali Bank, after it was hit by several financial scams, including that involving Hall-Mark Group.

On 15 March 2016 the then governor Atiur Rahman resigned from his post amid the Bangladesh Bank money laundering case. He submitted his resignation letter to Prime Minister Sheikh Hasina and within two hours Kabir was selected the new four-year term governor of Bangladesh Bank. He joined as the 11th Governor of Bangladesh Bank on 20 March 2016.
The government on 15 July, 2020 on Wednesday appointed Fazle Kabir governor of the Bangladesh Bank again for two years until he becomes 67 under the amended Bangladesh Bank Act.

Personal life
Kabir is married to Mahmuda Sharmin Benu. She is a former Secretary of the Government.

References

Living people
1955 births
Bangladeshi economists
University of Chittagong alumni
Governors of Bangladesh Bank
Faujdarhat Cadet College alumni